Star Blazers 2202, known in Japan as , is a Japanese military science fiction animated film series produced by Xebec, and the sequel to Star Blazers: Space Battleship Yamato 2199, originally based on the Space Battleship Yamato television series created by Yoshinobu Nishizaki and Leiji Matsumoto. It is directed by Nobuyoshi Habara (Fafner in the Azure) and written by Harutoshi Fukui (Mobile Suit Gundam Unicorn) with official character designs by Nobuteru Yuki. The first film of the series was released simultaneously in Japanese theaters and streaming services starting February 25, 2017. Similar to the first film series, the second loosely adapts both the animated series Space Battleship Yamato II and the movie Arrivederci Yamato.

Story
In 2202, three years after the Gamillas invasion of the Solar system, the people in the Solar System are finally at peace.  The Earth's biosphere has been restored with the Cosmo Reverse System brought by the Yamato at the end of Space Battleship Yamato 2199. With the end of the war, there is a peace treaty between Earth and Gamillas which will strengthen their military bond and secure true peace. In addition to the reconstruction of Earth, the joint forces form a new intergalactic defense fleet with a new ship, Andromeda, to be its new symbol of power. Earth is set on a path of military expansion despite Starsha Iscandar's wishes of peace, and developing new forms of wave motion gun despite the agreement between Starsha and the crew of the Yamato.

When a new threat called Gatlantis, also known as the White Comet Empire, starts to wreak havoc on a newly reformed galaxy, the goddess Teressa calls upon the Yamato once more in order to fight back against the new threat.

Production
The film series was first teased by producer Shoji Nishizaki in the Yamato Crew Report Magazine, stating that production of the sequel is in development. But added that it wasn't yet greenlighted. The first teaser of the film series was revealed on March 31, 2016 with an illustration by Makoto Kobayashi. It was later confirmed that director Nobuyoshi Habara, best known for the Fafner in the Azure anime and Fukui Harutoshi, the author of the Novel series Mobile Suit Gundam Unicorn will both direct and write the film series. Later on, the first teaser video of the film series was released.

Bandai Visual then later confirmed that the film will be released in both theaters in Japan as well as in several video streaming services in a limited basis. In December 2016, the official website confirmed that Kenjiro Tsuda will replace Keiji Fujiwara as Isami Enomoto while Hiroshi Kamiya and Masaki Terasoma were added as part of the cast. It soon followed with Sayaka Kanda as the voice of Teresa alongside a new 30 second trailer. Bandai Visual later released a special trailer of the film with the song "From Yamato with Love" and followed with the 12-minute preview stream of the first chapter.

The second film was released on June 24, 2017 the third released on October 14, 2017, while the fourth film is released on January 27, 2018. The fifth film was released on May 25, 2018; the sixth film on November 2, 2018 and the seventh and final film was released on March 1, 2019.

As with the first series, Space Battleship Yamato 2199, Voyager Entertainment and Funimation both licensed the series in North American territories, which commenced weekly streaming with an English-dubbed version (via Funimation) and an English Subtitled version (via Crunchyroll) on May 9, 2018.

Media

Anime films
Space Battleship Yamato 2202: Warriors of Love was released in Japanese theaters and on video streaming services starting February 25, 2017, with Blu-Ray Releases following after the film's limited release. The theme song for the films is titled  by the Osaka Shion Wind Orchestra and later, by Isao Sasaki while the ending songs are derived from the original Space Battleship Yamato II anime and film.

Anime television series
The TV version of the film series was broadcast on TV between October 6, 2018 and March 30, 2019. It was Xebec's final anime series.

Episode list

Recap film
, a recap film that compiles the Yamato 2199 and Yamato 2202 anime series with new scenes, was planned to be released on January 15, 2021, but was postponed to June 11, 2021 due to COVID-19 epidemic.

Novel
An ongoing novel adaptation by Yuka Minakawa was published by Kadokawa under the Kadokawa Shoten imprint on October 13, 2017. 4 volumes were published so far.

Notes

Staff notes

References

External links
  
 
 

2017 anime films
Animated television series reboots
Bandai
IG Port franchises
Bandai Visual
Funimation
Japanese science fiction television series
Military science fiction television series
Shochiku
Space Battleship Yamato
Space opera anime and manga
Television series set in the 22nd century
Xebec (studio)
TV Tokyo original programming